Niko Moon (born Nicholas Cowan; September 20, 1982) is an American country pop singer and songwriter signed to RCA Nashville. He has written songs for Dierks Bentley, Zac Brown Band, Rascal Flatts, and Morgan Wallen. He was also a member of the group Sir Rosevelt with Zac Brown and Ben Simonetti.

Background 

Nicholas Cowan is originally from Tyler, Texas but relocated to Douglasville, Georgia, when he was 10. His father, a truck driver and his mother, a waitress, introduced Niko to the works of artists like John Prine and Patty Griffin. He started out as a drummer after seeing his father play. His father was also a musician and gave up being a touring drummer when Niko was born.

Career 
Niko Moon first found success as a co-writer on songs for the Zac Brown Band, including “Heavy Is the Head”, “Homegrown”, “Beautiful Drug", "Keep Me in Mind", and "Loving You Easy”. He also co-produced the Zac Brown Band albums Jekyll+Hyde and Welcome Home, and co-wrote the song “Back To Life” for Rascal Flatts along with Cary Barlowe, Shay Mooney, and Fred Wilhelm. He appeared on Colt Ford’s album Every Chance I Get on the track "Waste Some Time" with Nappy Roots.

In 2016, Moon formed the group Sir Rosevelt with Zac Brown and Ben Simonetti, another co-writer with the Zac Brown Band. The group's track “The Bravest” was used during the 2018 FIFA World Cup.
Moon and Simonetti co-wrote a song on Michael Franti’s album Stay Human Vol. II.

In 2019, Niko Moon signed a recording contract with Sony Music Nashville imprint RCA Nashville.

Personal life 
Niko is married to singer-songwriter Anna Moon. They have a daughter, Lily Ann Moon.

Discography

Studio albums

EPs

Singles

Music videos

References

External links
 Official site

American country singer-songwriters
American male singer-songwriters
Living people
RCA Records Nashville artists
People from Tyler, Texas
Country musicians from Texas
1982 births
Singer-songwriters from Texas